Jiří Floder (born 1 March 1997) is a Czech football player who plays for FC Zbrojovka Brno.

References
 Profile at FC Zbrojovka Brno official site
 Profile at MSFL official site
 Profile at FAČR official site

1997 births
Living people
Czech footballers
Czech First League players
FC Zbrojovka Brno players
Footballers from Brno
Association football goalkeepers
SK Hanácká Slavia Kroměříž players
Czech National Football League players
Czech Republic youth international footballers